The Middleweight competition at the 2013 AIBA World Boxing Championships was held from 17 to 26 October 2013. Boxers were limited to a weight of 75 kilograms.

Medalists

Seeds

  Esquiva Florentino (third round)
  Dmytro Mytrofanov (third round)
  Bogdan Juratoni (quarterfinals)
  Zoltán Harcsa (quarterfinals)
  Jason Quigley (final)
  Zhanibek Alimkhanuly (champion)
  Stefan Härtel (quarterfinals)
  Aleksandar Drenovak (third round)
  Navruz Jafoev (second round)
  Jaba Khositashvili (second round)

Draw

Finals

Top half

Section 1

Section 2

Bottom half

Section 3

Section 4

References
Draw

2013 AIBA World Boxing Championships